Rhene formosa is a species of jumping spider in the genus Rhene that lives in the mountains of Guinea. The female was first identified in 2002 while the male remains unknown. The spider is small, with a line of white hairs on a darker brown carapace and a lighter beige and longer elongated abdomen.

Taxonomy
Rhene formosa was first identified by Charles Haddad and Wanda Wesołowska in 2011. It was allocated to the genus Rhene, which is named after the Greek female name, shared by mythological figures, in the family Salticidae. The species name is the Latin for shapely, and recalls the body shape of the spider.

Description
Only the female has been described. The carapace is hairy, mostly covered with brown and grey hairs, but with a line of white hairs behind the first row of eyes. The species is similar to the related Rhene pinguis, but differs in the design of its copulatory opening. The epigyne is large and the copulatory openings are hidden.

Distribution
The species has been found in the Guinea Highlands in Guinea.

References

Fauna of Guinea
Salticidae
Spiders described in 2002
Spiders of Africa
Taxa named by Wanda Wesołowska